The Dragons is a fantasy novel by Douglas Niles, set in the world of Dragonlance, and based on the Dungeons & Dragons role-playing game. It is the sixth novel in the "Lost Histories" series. It was published in paperback in October 1996. The short story Aurora's Eggs from The Dragons at War serves as a prequel to The Dragons.

Plot summary
The Dragons details the historical roots and struggles of the dragons of Krynn.

Reception

References

1996 novels
Dragonlance novels